Alina Boz (born 14 June 1998) is a Russian-born Turkish actress. She is best known for her series Elimi Bırakma and Maraşlı, and the Netflix series Aşk 101.

Early life
Alina Boz was born on 14 June 1998 in Moscow, Russia, to Turkish father and Russian mother. Her paternal grandparents were among the Turk minority in Bulgaria and then immigrated from Bulgaria to Turkey (also known as Bulgarian Turk). Boz was seven when her family moved to Turkey due to her father's new job. There she learned Turkish and attended primary school. She speaks Turkish, Russian and English. She studied at Private Gökjet Aviation High School. She began her dance career in the dance theatre. Before starting her acting career, Boz worked as a model on commercials and magazines.

Career
Before commencing her acting career, Boz worked in several commercials. She started her acting career at the age of fifteen in the 2013 series Cesur Hemşire as Canan. In 2014, she starred in the series Paramparça and depicted the character of Hazal along with actress Nurgül Yeşilçay. In 2016, she appeared in the movie Kaçma Birader and portrayed the character of Melis Kahvaci. In 2017, Boz had a role in the movie Böluk and also worked in the series Sevdanın Bahçesi as Defne. In 2018, she was cast in the series Vatanım Sensin as Princess Anastasia Romanova, and in the same year she had a leading role as Azra Güneş in the series Elimi Bırakama.

Boz had a leading role in the Netflix original series Aşk 101 and portrayed the character of "Eda". In 2021, she starred as Mahur Türel opposite Burak Deniz in the television series Maraşlı. In 2021, she signed a contract for the brand Duru, she received 1 million Turkish lira for the deal. The commercial was shot in Bursa. Simultaneously, Boz starred in the sequel of Aşk 101, which premiered on 30 September 2021 on Netflix. 

In 2021, she was cast in the movie Bandırma Füze Kulübü and depicted the leading female role of Leyla, the movie was set in the late 1950s and focused on a group of qualified students who began constructing missiles. In 2022, Boz starred in the short film Babamın Öldüğü Gün and depicted the character of Hale, who was the coping the death of her father, with her sister Sema, portrayed by Nur Fettahoğlu.

Filmography

References

External links
 
 

Living people
1998 births
Actresses from Istanbul
Actresses from Moscow
Turkish television actresses
21st-century Turkish actresses
Turkish film actresses
Turkish people of Russian descent
Russian people of Turkish descent
Golden Butterfly Award winners